E. M. Tucker was an American architect of St. Louis, Missouri, who worked for the Missouri Pacific Railroad.

Tucker worked for the Illinois Central Railroad beginning in 1901. Tucker was a member of American Railway Engineering Association, and served in the Association's Committee XXIII Shops and Locomotive Terminals in 1920.  At least six structures designed by Tucker are listed in the National Register of Historic Places. Three stations, in Little Rock and Texarkana, Arkansas, and Washington, Missouri, are still in use by Amtrak as passenger stations.

Works 
Missouri Pacific depot, Prescott, Arkansas, 1912
St. Louis, Iron Mountain & Southern Depot, Sikeston, Missouri, 1916, NRHP 0001549
Missouri Pacific Freight Station, Independence, Kansas, 1916
Missouri Pacific Roundhouse, Joplin, Missouri, c1917
Missouri Pacific Depot, Charleston, Missouri, 1917, NRHP 72000722
Missouri Pacific Passenger Station, Mineral Point, Missouri, 1918
Missouri Pacific Depot, El Dorado, Kansas, 1918, NRHP 94000429
Union Station, Little Rock, Arkansas, 1921, NRHP 77000270
Missouri Pacific Station, Lake Village, Arkansas, 1922
Missouri Pacific Station, Washington, Missouri, 1923
Missouri Pacific Station, Harrisburg, Arkansas, c1923
Missouri Pacific Railroad Hospital, Little Rock, Arkansas, 1925
St. Louis, Iron Mountain and Southern Railway Station, Malvern, Arkansas, 1925
Missouri Pacific Building, St. Louis, Missouri, 1928, NRHP 02001441, Mauran, Russell & Crowell with E. M. Tucker
Union Station, Texarkana, Arkansas, 1930, NRHP 78000611

Gallery

References

Architects from St. Louis
American railway architects
Year of birth missing
Year of death missing
Missouri Pacific Railroad